The 2019 World Junior Ice Hockey Championships (2019 WJC) was the 43rd edition of the Ice Hockey World Junior Championship. It began on December 26, 2018, and ended with the gold medal game being played on January 5, 2019. This marked the 15th time that Canada  hosted the WJC.

On December 1, 2016, it was announced that Vancouver and Victoria, British Columbia had won the bid to host the 2019 World Juniors. This is the second time that Vancouver has been the primary host of the tournament and the first time that Victoria has hosted in any capacity.

Top Division

Venues

Officials
The following officials were assigned by the International Ice Hockey Federation to officiate the 2019 World Junior Championships.

Referees
  Jonathan Alarie
  Kenneth Anderson
  Andris Ansons
  Tobias Björk
  Andrew Bruggeman
  Lassi Heikkinen
  Jeff Ingram
  Daniel Pražák
  Yevgeni Romasko
  Maxim Sidorenko
  Mikael Sjöqvist
  Peter Stano

Linesmen
  Maxime Chaput
  Dmitri Golyak
  Michael Harrington
  Daniel Hynek
  Balazs Kovacs
  Lauri Nikulainen
  Brian Oliver
  Peter Šefčík
  Dmitri Shishlo
  Emil Yletyinen

Seeding
The seedings in the preliminary round are based on the 2018 tournament's final standings using the serpentine system. On 6 Jan 2018, the IIHF announced the groups. With Kazakhstan being promoted from Division I A after winning the  2018 Division I A Tournament. 

Group A (Vancouver)
 (1)
 (4)
 (5)
 (8)
 (9)

Group B (Victoria)
 (2)
 (3)
 (6)
 (7)
 (11-Promoted)

Rosters

Format
The preliminary round is a two group of five teams each internal round-robin format, followed by a three-round playoff. In the round-robin, three points are allotted for a regulation win, and two points for an overtime or shootout win. One point is allotted for an overtime or shootout loss.

The four highest-ranked teams from each group of the preliminary round advance to the quarterfinals while the last-place team from each group will play a best-of-three series, the loser relegated to Division IA for 2020, being replaced by the winner of Division IA. All other teams will retain their Top Division status for the 2020 edition.

Preliminary round
All times are local. (Pacific Standard Time – UTC-8)

Group A

Group B

Relegation

Playoff round

Quarterfinals

Semifinals

Bronze medal game

Final

Statistics

Scoring leaders 

GP = Games played; G = Goals; A = Assists; Pts = Points; +/− = Plus-minus; PIM = Penalties In MinutesSource: IIHF

Goaltending leaders 

(minimum 40% team's total ice time)

TOI = Time On Ice (minutes:seconds); GA = Goals against; GAA = Goals against average; SA = Shots against; Sv% = Save percentage; SO = ShutoutsSource: IIHF

Final standings

Awards
Best players selected by the directorate:
Best Goaltender:  Pyotr Kochetkov
Best Defenceman:  Alexander Romanov
Best Forward:  Ryan Poehling
Source: IIHF

Media All-Stars:
MVP:  Ryan Poehling
Goaltender:  Ukko-Pekka Luukkonen
Defencemen:  Alexander Romanov /  Erik Brännström
Forwards:  Grigori Denisenko /  Philipp Kurashev /  Ryan Poehling
Source: IIHF

Division I

Group A
The Group A tournament was held in Füssen, Germany from 9 to 15 December 2018.

Group B
The Group B tournament was held in Tychy, Poland from 8 to 14 December 2018.

Division II

Group A
The Group A tournament was held in Tallinn, Estonia from 13 to 19 January 2019.

Group B
The Group B tournament was held in Zagreb, Croatia from 15 to 21 January 2019.

Division III

The tournament was held in Reykjavík, Iceland from 14 to 20 January 2019.

Group A

Group B

Bracket

References

External links
2019 IIHF World Junior Championship

 
2019
World Junior Championships 2019
2019, World Junior Ice Hockey Championships
2019, World Junior Ice Hockey Championships
2019 World Junior Ice Hockey Championships
December 2018 sports events in Canada
January 2019 sports events in Canada
2019 in British Columbia
World Junior Championships
2019, World Junior Ice Hockey Championships
2019, World Junior Ice Hockey Championships